NRK Jazz is a Norwegian radio station operated by the Norwegian Broadcasting Corporation (NRK) that broadcasts jazz on DAB Digital Radio and the internet.

External links 
 NRK Jazz
NRK Jazz (NRK Jazz online radio)

NRK
Radio stations in Norway
Jazz radio stations
Norwegian jazz
Year of establishment missing